Mezobromelia capituligera is a plant species in the genus Mezobromelia. This species is native to West Indies (Cuba, Hispaniola, Jamaica, Trinidad, Leeward Islands) and northern South America (Venezuela, Colombia, Ecuador, Peru).

References

capituligera
Flora of South America
Flora of the Caribbean
Plants described in 1866
Flora without expected TNC conservation status